Telegraph Hill is a largely residential conservation area bounded by Nunhead and Brockley and is an electoral ward just south of New Cross in the London Borough of Lewisham in southeast London, England.

History 

It gained its current name from a semaphore telegraph station which was constructed on the summit of the hill circa 1795. The signalling station was one of the points from which news of Wellington's victory at Waterloo was flashed to London. It was removed in 1823.

The poet Robert Browning at one time lived at the foot of Telegraph Hill, in a cottage which he wrote looked like a 'goose pie'.

For many years Telegraph Hill was covered by market gardens owned by the Worshipful Company of Haberdashers, one of the ancient livery companies of London. In the late 19th century the Haberdashers decided to develop Telegraph Hill for housing. The company had already built terraced housing on its land nearer New Cross Road when it commissioned a study of the development potential of Telegraph Hill in 1859. The surveyor recommended 'the erection of dwelling houses of a high standard' on wide tree-lined streets.

Most construction took place around 1871. The villas are distinctive in style and as a result of this architectural unity Telegraph Hill is now a conservation area. The company added Haberdashers' Aske's School for boys and girls (named after one of its members Robert Aske, and now Haberdashers' Hatcham College) in 1875, a separate Haberdashers' Aske's girls' school in 1891 and St Catherine's Church in 1894.

In the 1895 the London County Council opened Telegraph Hill Park to the public.

St Catherine's Church 
St Catherine's Church was built in 1893 on the summit of Telegraph Hill. Designed by the surveyor to the Haberdashers Company as part of their development of the area around Telegraph Hill, it was destroyed by fire on 6
May 1913, allegedly arson by suffragettes, and rebuilt “with a larger chancel” by Stock, Page & Stock (i.e. the present church, although that was badly damaged in World War 2). No description has been found of the original church.

In 1993, the vicar and curate of St Catherine's Church met with local residents and set up the Telegraph Hill Festival. Since then, the Vicar and Parochial Church Council (PCC) of St Catherine's Church has, in partnership with Telegraph Hill Centre, been instrumental in working with local residents to set up a controversially named 'hill station' cafe as part of its ownership of the whole site.

Telegraph Hill Centre 
Telegraph Hill Centre was built in 1971 and opened in 1972 by Bishop Trevor Huddleston and actress Glenda Jackson. Funding from London Borough of Lewisham was cut in 1986/7 and ownership and funding of the site reverted to St Catherine's Church.   In 1993, the vicar and curate of St Catherine's Church met with local residents and set up the Telegraph Hill Festival.   Centre is now a self-funded entity owned by St Catherine's Church, and continues to provide services with and for the community on Telegraph Hill and its surrounding areas.

Telegraph Hill Festival 
Telegraph Hill Festival ran for 25 years and included musical events, plays, public art and open studios across the area, becoming increasingly noted for its public engagement and popularity in its last five years up to 2019.

Telegraph Hill Park 

Telegraph Hill Park is in two halves on either side of Kitto Road; the upper park contains tennis courts which apparently occupy the site of the telegraph station which gave the hill its name. This upper part is the only part of the park to allow dogs, and is a popular spot amongst the local community for watching the New Years fireworks across London due to its excellent vantage point and view across the London skyline. The lower park contains ponds, children's playgrounds and a concrete space for ball games as well as a statue of Olaudah Equiano. A farmers' market is held in the lower park on every Saturday 10am-3pm.

Telegraph Hill Society 
The Telegraph Hill Society was a local residents' group which campaigned for improvements to the area.

Schools and colleges
Telegraph Hill is home to the Haberdashers' Hatcham College. A Coade stone statue of Robert Aske stands in the forecourt of Haberdasher's Boys' School in Pepys Road. It dates from 1836 and shows him in the robes of the Haberdashers' Company, leaning on a plinth and holding the plans of the buildings in his hand.

Robert Aske  (24 February 1619 – 27 January 1689) was a merchant and haberdasher in the City of London chiefly remembered for the charitable foundation created from his estate, which nowadays operates the Haberdashers' Schools. Aske was the son of an affluent draper, and became a Freeman of the Worshipful Company of Haberdashers in 1643, being elected an Alderman of the City of London in 1666. Less well known is Aske’s history of profit from slave trading.

Aske held £500 of original stock in the Royal Africa Company, the equivalent of approximately £106,000 in 2020 calculated using the Bank of England inflation calculator.
 The Royal African Company of England charter granted by Charles II gave it a monopoly in the transportation of people from the west coast of Africa to English colonies in the Americas and explicitly sanctioned “the buying and selling, bartering and exchanging of, for, and with any negro slaves, goods, wares and merchandizes whatsoever to be vended or found” in western Africa. The Royal Africa Company was, until 1687, very prosperous.  It was during this period that Aske held investments, and the Company transported about 5,000 enslaved people a year to be bought and sold in markets. As historian William Pettigrew states, the company “shipped more enslaved African women, men and children to the Americas than any other single institution during the entire period of the transatlantic slave trade,” and that investors in the company were fully aware of its activities and intended to profit from this exploitation. Under this system, it is estimated that between 1663 and the end of the 17th century Britain enslaved and transported over 332,000 Africans across the Atlantic.

The hill's other secondary school, Telegraph Hill School, closed in 2003. A campaign by local parents failed to persuade the council to establish a new secondary school on the site. Instead, a sixth form centre called Crossways Sixth Form was built on the site, and opened in 2004. The site was taken over by Christ the King Sixth Form College in 2013. Telegraph Hill also has a primary school: the Edmund Waller Primary School, in Waller Road.

Politics
Telegraph Hill ward is one of 18 council wards that make up the Lewisham borough council.

Demography

In comparison with overall numbers for London and England, the majority of Telegraph Hill ward's population is young; typically aged 34 and under, with a smaller than average population among the 35 plus and older age groups.

Approximately 51% of the ward's population identified as white, while 8% identified as Asian/Asian British, and 30% as Black/African/Caribbean/Black British. Lewisham is the 15th most ethnically diverse local authority in England, and two out of every five residents are from a black, Asian or ethnically diverse background.

Notes

External links

Telegraph Hill Centre
Haberdashers’ Aske’s Foundation
The next station to the west on the telegraph line including image of the shutter telegraph here
More information about the Telegraph Hill's three borough councillors, on the Lewisham borough website 

Areas of London
Districts of the London Borough of Lewisham